Kamiko Williams (born April 6, 1991) is a professional basketball player who last played for the New York Liberty of the Women's National Basketball Association (WNBA).

Tennessee  statistics
Source

WNBA
During a team practice Williams tore a knee ligament, causing her to miss the entire 2014 WNBA season.

Personal life
Williams finished her first college degree in three years.

References

Living people
1991 births
American women's basketball players
Basketball players from North Carolina
New York Liberty draft picks
New York Liberty players
Sportspeople from Fayetteville, North Carolina
Tennessee Lady Volunteers basketball players
Guards (basketball)